Shan State Government is the cabinet of Shan State in Myanmar. The cabinet is led by chief minister, Dr.Linn Htut.

Linn Htut's Cabinet(1 April 2016 - 31 March 2021)

Sao Aung Myat's Cabinet(1 April 2011 - 31 March 2016)

References 
http://www.president-office.gov.mm/?q=cabinet/region-and-state-government/id-10178

Shan State
State and region governments of Myanmar